Career Advancement Accounts are an attempt to better educate low-income individuals created by George W. Bush as part of the American Competitiveness Initiative.  It is being administered through Employment and Training Administration.

References 
US Department of Labor (October 26, 2006).  U.S. Labor Department Launches Self-Directed Career Advancement Accounts. Press release.
US Department of Labor (October 26, 2006).  Career Advancement Account Demonstrations:  Three-State Demonstration.  Press release.
US Department of Labor (October 26, 2006).  Career Advancement Account Demonstrations:  Automotive Industry Demonstration.  Press release.

Federal assistance in the United States